The Crăiasa is a right tributary of the river Crișul Negru in Romania. It discharges into the Crișul Negru in Sudrigiu.

References

Rivers of Romania
Rivers of Bihor County